The National Defense Authorization Act for Fiscal Year 2010 (123 Stat. 2190.) is a law in the United States signed by President Barack Obama on October 28, 2009. As a bill it was H.R. 2647 in the 111th Congress. The overall purpose of the law is to authorize funding for the defense of the United States and its interests abroad, for military construction, and for national security-related energy programs.

Division A 
3.4% basic military pay raise

Title I 
 Subtitle D, Sections 132 & 133 repealed the FY 2009 F-22 Raptor fighter aircraft funding and re-directed it to preserving the maintenance and tooling of the existing program.

Title V 
 Subtitle H - Military and Overseas Voter Empowerment Act

Title XII 
 Subtitle B - Success in Countering Al Qaeda Reporting Requirements Act of 2009
 Subtitle D - Victims of Iranian Censorship Act (or the VOICE Act)
 Authorizes the Secretary of State to continue efforts in support of Iranian dissidents

Title XVIII 
 Military Commissions Act of 2009 - completely amended the existing statutes.

Title XIX 
 Non-Foreign Area Retirement Equity Assurance Act of 2009

Division B 
 Military Construction Authorization Act for Fiscal Year 2010

Division E 
 Matthew Shepard and James Byrd, Jr. Hate Crimes Prevention Act
Expanded federal hate crime law to include crimes motivated by a victim's actual or perceived gender, sexual orientation, gender identity, or disability.

See also
National Defense Authorization Act
 Department of Homeland Security Appropriations Act, 2010
 American Communities' Right to Public Information Act
 OPEN FOIA Act of 2009
 Protected National Security Documents Act of 2009

References

U.S. National Defense Authorization Acts
Acts of the 111th United States Congress